Ian Douglas Campbell, 11th and 4th Duke of Argyll (18 June 1903 – 7 April 1973), was a Scottish peer and the Chief of Clan Campbell. He is chiefly remembered for his unhappy marriage to, and scandalous 1963 divorce from, his third wife, Margaret Whigham.

Early life
Ian Douglas Campbell was born in Paris, France. He was the son of Douglas Walter Campbell and his wife, Aimee Marie Suzanne Lawrence. His paternal grandfather, Lord Walter Campbell, was the third son of the 8th Duke of Argyll. He was educated at Milton Academy in the United States and Christ Church, Oxford.

He served during the Second World War with the rank of captain in the 8th Battalion Argyll and Sutherland Highlanders and saw combat during the Fall of France. Along with his commanding officer Maj. Gen. Victor Fortune, the war poet Aonghas Caimbeul, and all surviving members of the 51st (Highland) Division, Captain Campbell surrendered to Wehrmacht General Erwin Rommel at Saint-Valery-en-Caux in Normandy on June 12, 1940. He was held as a prisoner of war until 1945. 

He inherited the titles Duke of Argyll and Chief of Clan Campbell following the death of his first cousin once removed, the 10th Duke, on 20 August 1949.

Personal life
Argyll was married four times. He was known to be addicted to alcohol, gambling, and prescription drugs. The Duke was also accused of physical and emotional abuse by his wives, whose money he tried to use for maintaining Inveraray Castle. His first marriage was to The Honourable Janet Gladys Aitken (1908–1988), daughter of business tycoon and press baron Lord Beaverbrook, on 12 December 1927. They had a daughter, Lady Jeanne Campbell (1928–2007).

Ian and Janet divorced in 1934. Argyll's second marriage was to Louise Hollingsworth Morris Vanneck, née Clews (d. 10 February 1970), daughter of Henry Clews Jr. by his wife Louise Hollingsworth Morris (ex-wife 1894–1901 of Frederick Gebhard) of Baltimore, Maryland, and former wife of Hon. Andrew Vanneck (md 1930–1933) on 23 November 1935. This marriage produced two sons:

Ian Campbell, 12th Duke of Argyll (1937–2001), who married Iona Colquhoun on 4 July 1964. They had two children:
Torquhil Campbell, 13th Duke of Argyll (b. 1968). On 8 June 2002 at St. Mary's Church, Fairford, Gloucestershire, the Duke married Eleanor Cadbury, a member of the Cadbury chocolate family. The Duke and Duchess have three children:
Archibald Friedrich Campbell, Marquess of Lorne (born London, 9 March 2004), known as Archie Lorne.
Lord Rory James Campbell (born London, 3 February 2006)
Lady Charlotte Mary Campbell (born London, 29 October 2008).
Lady Louise Iona Campbell (b. 1972), who married Anthony Burrell on 18 April 1998. They have two children.

Lord Colin Ivar Campbell (b. 1946), who married Georgia Arianna Ziadie on 23 March 1974; they were divorced in 1975.

This marriage also ended in divorce, in 1951.

Argyll's third marriage was to Margaret Whigham (1912–1993), mother of Frances, Dowager Duchess of Rutland, from her previous marriage to Charles Francis Sweeny. They were married on 22 March 1951.  Margaret was a glittering society figure.  While married to the Duke, she had affairs with other men including actor Douglas Fairbanks Jr. and Duncan Sandys, the Minister of Defence. The marriage was childless and they divorced in 1963 after the Duke found Polaroid  photographs of her sexual activities with other men. In the divorce proceedings, the Duke produced the photographs, which featured the Duchess wearing only her signature triple-string of pearls while fellating an unidentified man. In hearings which gained much media attention, the divorce was granted, though on grounds of adultery with a different man.

Argyll's fourth and final marriage was to Mathilda Coster Mortimer (1925–1997) on 15 June 1963.  Mathilda, who was first married to Clemens Heller, founder of the Salzburg Global Seminar, a school in Salzburg, Austria, was the granddaughter of New York banker and clubman William B. Coster.  From this marriage he had a daughter:

Lady Elspeth Campbell (1967–1967), who lived only five days.

They remained married until the Duke's death on 7 April 1973. He died in a nursing home in Edinburgh. He was succeeded by his son Ian.

While most Dukes and Duchesses of Argyll are buried at Kilmun Parish Church, the 11th Duke and his son, the 12th Duke, both chose to be buried on the island of Inishail in Loch Awe.

Ancestry

In popular culture
 Ian and Margaret's marriage and scandalous divorce was dramatised in the Amazon/BBC's A Very British Scandal, written by Sarah Phelps and broadcast in 2021, starring Paul Bettany as the Duke, Claire Foy as Margaret Campbell, Duchess of Argyll, and Sophia Myles as the Duke's previous wife, Louise Timpson.

References

External links

Ian Campbell, 11th Duke of Argyll

11
Iain Campbell, 11th Duke of Argyll
20th-century Scottish landowners
1903 births
1973 deaths
Milton Academy alumni
Alumni of Christ Church, Oxford
Argyll and Sutherland Highlanders officers
British Army personnel of World War II
Aitken family
20th-century Scottish businesspeople
British expatriates in France